Anil Agarwal is an Indian politician and an MP from the Bharatiya Janata Party from Uttar Pradesh. He was fielded as the ninth candidate in the ten Rajya Sabha seats which went for elections He defeated Bhimrao Ambedkar of the BSP who got 35 first preference votes and required a minimum of 37 votes. He had got 22 first preference votes and increased the tally based on second preference votes.

References 

Living people
Rajya Sabha members from Uttar Pradesh
People from Uttar Pradesh
Bharatiya Janata Party politicians from Uttar Pradesh
Rajya Sabha members from the Bharatiya Janata Party
Sam Higginbottom University of Agriculture, Technology and Sciences alumni
1962 births